In architecture, a hood mould, hood, label mould (from Latin labia, lip), drip mould or dripstone, is an external moulded projection from a wall over an opening to throw off rainwater, historically often in form of a pediment. This moulding can be terminated at the side by ornamentation called a label stop.

The hood mould was introduced into architecture in the Romanesque period, though they became much more common in the Gothic period. Later, with the increase in rectangular windows they became more prevalent in domestic architecture.

Styles of hood moulding

References

Architectural elements